Swalaba is a neighborhood in Ghana’s capital city Accra. It is located in the city center between Korle Woko and Jamestown. Its population is mainly from the Ga tribal group, but houses also members of Hausa, Ewe, and Akan. Its narrow streets called "lungu lungu" makes Swalaba resemble a labyrinth and it is known to be difficult to get around for anyone not familiar with the area. The people of Swalaba are viewed as friendly, hospitable but also with a penchant for being direct and espouse a  no nonsense attitude.

Populated places in the Greater Accra Region